The Lucas L7, also called the L 7 and L-7, is a French amateur-built aircraft that was designed by Emile Lucas of Lagny-le-Sec. The aircraft is supplied in the form of plans for amateur construction.

Design and development
The L7 features a strut-braced high-wing, a two-seats-in-side-by-side configuration enclosed cockpit with doors for access, fixed main tricycle landing gear with a retractable nosewheel and a single engine in tractor configuration.

The aircraft is made from sheet aluminum.

Reviewers Roy Beisswenger and Marino Boric described the design in a 2015 review as have a "somewhat boxy shape".

Specifications (L7)

References

External links

Homebuilt aircraft
Single-engined tractor aircraft
High-wing aircraft
2000s French civil utility aircraft